Guy Mark Gillette (February 3, 1879March 3, 1973) was an American politician serving as a Democratic U.S. Representative and Senator from Iowa. In the U.S. Senate, Gillette was elected, re-elected, defeated, elected again, and defeated again.

Personal background
Born in Cherokee, Iowa, he attended public school and graduated from Drake University Law School in Des Moines in 1900. He was admitted to the bar in 1900 and commenced practice in Cherokee. During the Spanish–American War, he served as a sergeant in the Fifty-second Iowa Regiment in the United States Army, but never saw combat. He volunteered to fight alongside the Boers in the Second Boer War (1898–1902), but was turned down.

Returning to Iowa, he engaged in agricultural pursuits and was the city attorney of Cherokee in 1906–1907. He became the prosecuting attorney of Cherokee County from 1907 to 1909 and a member of the Iowa State Senate from 1912 to 1916.

During the First World War, he served as a captain in the United States Army. He ran unsuccessfully for Iowa State Auditor in 1918, and returned to Cherokee to farm.

Service in the U.S. House, then U.S. Senate (1933–1945)
In 1932, in the Roosevelt landslide, he was elected as a Democrat to represent Iowa's 9th congressional district, in heavily Republican northwest Iowa.  He was re-elected in 1934, and served nearly all of that term. He resigned upon his election to the United States Senate on November 3, 1936, to serve out the remainder of the term of Senator Richard Louis Murphy, who had died in an auto accident.  Nearly two years remained in Murphy's term, which would end January 3, 1939. Although he generally supported the New Deal, he opposed the new wage and hours bill, a new farm bill, and aspects of the Social Security system.

In 1938 the Roosevelt administration targeted Gillette for replacement because of Gillette's vote against Roosevelt's plan to expand the Supreme Court and other positions. He nevertheless defeated Roosevelt's choice for the Democratic nomination, Congressman Otha D. Wearin, and was narrowly elected to his first full Senate term.  During that term, his conflicts with the Roosevelt administration expanded, on topics as diverse as the terms of the Neutrality Act, Roosevelt's pursuit of third and fourth terms, and choices for judgeships.

After the Japanese attack on Pearl Harbor (where, coincidentally, Gillette's brother Captain Claude Gillette managed the Navy yard), Gillette became "more of an internationalist".  Nevertheless, he used his chairmanship on a Senate subcommittee to aggressively challenge the Roosevelt administration's failure to prepare for the prospect of a Japanese seizure of the source of the nation's rubber imports by developing synthetic farm-based alternatives. In April 1943 a confidential analysis by British scholar Isaiah Berlin of the Senate Foreign Relations Committee for the Foreign Office succinctly characterized Gillette:

Like several others who had opposed Roosevelt's efforts to aid the United Kingdom before Pearl Harbor but faced wartime elections, Gillette lost his next race, in 1944, to Iowa Governor and Republican Bourke B. Hickenlooper.

Between terms
Within days of Gillette's first defeat, Roosevelt nominated him as the chairman of the three-member Surplus Property Board, prompting The Washington Post and a Life editorial to quip that the president was confusing the problem of surplus property with the problem of surplus politicians.  He took an early dislike to the job, and complained that he was often outvoted by the two other members.   After resigning from the Surplus Board in May 1945, he became president of the American League for a Free Palestine, serving until the Committee's work ended with the establishment of the state of Israel in 1948.

Return to the Senate (1949–1955)
He made a political comeback in 1948, unseating former governor George A. Wilson from Iowa's other Senate seat. In 1951 his Subcommittee on Privileges and Elections conducted an investigation of Wisconsin Senator Joseph McCarthy's campaign practices. Gillette served until January 3, 1955, after his own bid for re-election was thwarted by U.S. Representative Thomas E. Martin of Iowa City. His defeat was considered an upset because it conflicted with polls. For the last time, it left every Iowa seat in Congress in Republican hands.
From 1951 onwards Senator Gillette was one of the first to call for a North Atlantic Assembly.

Post-Senate
Following his second defeat, Gillette initially remained on Capitol Hill, serving as counsel with the Senate Post Office and Civil Service Committee (from 1955 to 1956) and the Senate Judiciary Committee (from 1956 to 1961).

He retired and resided in Cherokee until his death at age 94 on March 3, 1973, and was interred in Oak Hill Cemetery.

Publications
 "The Forgotten Consumer." Challenge, vol. 1, no. 2 (Nov. 1952), pp. 29–33. .
 "The Senate in Foreign Relations." Annals of the American Academy of Political and Social Science, vol. 289 (Sep. 1953), pp. 49–57. .
 "Preparing For UN Charter Review." World Affairs, vol. 117, no. 3 (Fall 1954), pp. 67–69. .
 "United Nations Charter Review." Proceedings of the American Society of International Law at Its Annual Meeting (1921-1969), vol. 48 (Apr. 22-24, 1954), pp. 191–211. .

See also
Guy M. and Rose (Freeman) Gillette House in Cherokee, Iowa

References

Bibliography
 "Gillette, Guy (Mark)." In: Current Biography, 1946: Who's News and Why. New York: H.W. Wilson (1947), pp. 207-210. .
 Harrington, Jerry. "Senator Guy Gillette Foils the Execution Committee." The Palimpsest 62 (Nov./Dec. 1981), pp. 170–80

External links 

1879 births
1973 deaths
Democratic Party Iowa state senators
People from Cherokee, Iowa
American military personnel of the Spanish–American War
United States Army soldiers
American prosecutors
United States Army personnel of World War I
United States Army officers
Democratic Party United States senators from Iowa
Democratic Party members of the United States House of Representatives from Iowa
20th-century American politicians
Military personnel from Iowa
Drake University Law School alumni